Samer Khaled Salem (born 15 January 1993), commonly known as Samer Salem, is a Syrian footballer who plays for Hutteen in the Syrian Premier League.

Club career

Jordan
On 5 August 2013, he signed a one-year contract with Al-Hussein (Irbid).

Oman
On 16 July 2014, he arrived in Oman and on 18 July 2014, he signed a one-year contract with Al-Oruba SC. He made his Oman Professional League debut on 13 September 2014 in a 3-0 loss against Saham SC.

On 28 January 2015, he signed a six-month contract with another Omani club Al-Khabourah SC.

References

External links

Samer Salem at Football.com

1993 births
Living people
Sportspeople from Aleppo
Syrian footballers
Syrian expatriate footballers
Association football forwards
Al-Orouba SC players
Al-Khabourah SC players
Oman Professional League players
Expatriate footballers in Yemen
Syrian expatriate sportspeople in Yemen
Expatriate footballers in Jordan
Syrian expatriate sportspeople in Jordan
Expatriate footballers in Oman
Syrian expatriate sportspeople in Oman
Syrian Premier League players
Syria youth international footballers